Tom Sykes (born 19 August 1985 in Huddersfield, West Yorkshire, England) is a professional motorcycle racer who first competed in World Superbike Championship during . For the 2022 season, Sykes rejoined his former team Paul Bird Motorsport riding a Ducati in British Superbikes, finishing in 12th place.

Following his fourth place world superbike championship finish in 2018, Sykes left the Kawasaki factory racing team and raced BMWs for Shaun Muir Racing from 2019, until being dropped by BMW Motorsport during the 2021 season with an announcement that Scott Redding had been contracted for 2022. For 2023, he races in world superbikes for a satellite Kawasaki team.

Sykes also holds World Superbike Championship records for the most career pole positions and ranks second to Troy Corser in career race starts. When reviewing his World Superbike statistics in early 2022, UK publication Motorcycle News quoted 34 wins, 114 podiums and 51 pole positions from 349 races.

In 2007 he gained his first ride in British Superbikes, riding a Stobart Vent-Axia Honda; Sykes finished in sixth position in the championship in his rookie year. Following this success he was signed by the Rizla Suzuki team for the 2008 season; he went on to finish 4th in the championship as well as making wildcard World Superbike appearances at Brands Hatch & Donington Park, where he impressed strongly, helping him gain a World Superbike ride at Yamaha Motor Italia for the 2009 season. For 2010 he raced a PBM Racing Kawasaki in the series. He won his first SBK title in 2013 for Kawasaki.

Career

Early career
Sykes credits his racing career to his grandfather Peter Brook who loaned him his 600cc Ninja for a race weekend and financing his start. Sykes raced in the Supersport division of the British Superbike championship from 2003 to 2006, finishing 8th, 5th, 6th, and as runner-up to Cal Crutchlow in 2006.

British Superbike Championship (2007–2008)
2007 was his first season in the British Superbike championship, riding for the Stobart Vent-Axia Honda team alongside 2003 series champion Shane Byrne. He finished 18 of the first 20 rounds, including a pair of 4th places at Snetterton. Second on the grid at Oulton Park, and pole at Donington Park. Sykes took his first two podiums at the Croft Circuit, to move up to 6th in the championship, immediately behind Byrne, and immediately ahead of Leon Camier on another Honda.

Shortly after joining the Rizla Suzuki team for 2008, he was seen testing a Suzuki MotoGP bike. Sykes started the 2008 with a 6th and an 8th at Thruxton (The first races were there as the season opener at Brands Hatch was snowed off). He took pole position at Oulton Park, but crashed at the aborted start of race 1, before finishing 5th on the restart . He led race 2 until being taken out by Leon Haslam, who was excluded for the move. Sykes continued to finish towards the front of the field consistently scoring podiums at Brands Hatch (2nd), Donington Park (3rd) and Snetterton (3rd) all in the first of the 2 races. It was at Oulton Park where he scored his first two victories, taking the lead from James Ellison late in race 1 but leading most of race 2. He followed that up with a third straight win at Knockhill in the first race, and collected podiums for the rest of the championship. Sykes finished 4th in the championship with 316 points, 2 points behind Cal Crutchlow.

Superbike World Championship

2008–2021

Sykes made his World Superbike Championship debut at Brands Hatch as a wildcard, impressing by qualifying sixth (ahead of three works Suzukis with more powerful engines, including title contender Max Neukirchner). He retired from a strong position in race 1 due to a hole in the radiator by rocks thrown up by Max Biaggi's Sterilgarda Ducati machine, but came back to finish 6th in race 2. He gained a second wildcard meeting at Donington Park in changeable conditions, where he proved even stronger. He again qualified on the second row, but got a flying start in race one and had a comfortable lead when the race was red-flagged due to oil from Noriyuki Haga's Yamaha. Knowing he had to finish within 4 seconds of Troy Bayliss to win on aggregate, Sykes lead early in race two, before easing off after seeing a white flag with a red cross, which typically means a slippery surface (often with the yellow and red striped oil flag), but racing in British Superbike Championship races, the flag neutralises the race under a full-course caution period with safety car deployment, so Sykes and Leon Haslam both eased up, anticipating neutralisation, but the time lost here proved costly, as Sykes failed to stay close enough to Bayliss, finishing second behind the three-time series champion. He was less competitive in race two, but his reputation had still been boosted.

On 11 September 2008 Sykes signed a contract with the Yamaha Motor Italia World Superbike team for the 2009 season, with an option to extend that contract until 2010 depending on results. Sykes had an average year finishing mostly mid-pack, while his team mate Ben Spies was at the front of the field. This led to Yamaha not offering Sykes a second year, instead hiring fellow Brits James Toseland and Cal Crutchlow.

Sykes signed for the Paul Bird Motorsport Kawasaki team for 2010, as had been rumoured, enabling him to stay in the World Superbike class. Sykes said “It’s going to be a challenge, but I’m looking forward to it. I believe that from what is in place in the team we’re going to be able to do a good job.”

The Kawasaki was relatively uncompetitive in 2010, but Sykes managed a strong fifth place at Monza. He was the team leader for much of the year, with the more experienced Chris Vermeulen struggling following a knee injury sustained at the first round at Phillip Island. Despite speculation as to his future with the team, Sykes flew to Japan to help test the ZX-10R, the bike the team will use for 2011. He made a wildcard appearance with the team in the British Superbike Championship at Brands Hatch.

On the final weekend of the 2010 World Superbike Championship season, Sykes confirmed that he had signed a one-year contract with Kawasaki that would see him ride in the 2011 Superbike World Championship season.

Sykes crashed in the chicane at Donington Park shortly after he passed an Aprilia and moved up to 4th place and he was taken out of the race while his teammates managed mid-placings. He finished close to last in race 2, but Lascorz made 6th. In the following race at the Nürburgring however, he gained his first victory in Race 2.

In the following season, Sykes became runner-up, missing the title only by half a point against Max Biaggi.

Tom Sykes has been crowned the 2013 World Superbike Champion after securing the third-place finish he needed to secure a popular title victory at Jerez, while Eugene Laverty took a dramatic last corner victory over Marco Melandri.

On 21 June 2014, Tom Sykes captured his 21st career Superpole at Italy’s Misano World Circuit for round seven of the series.

By the end of the 2018 season, Tom Sykes and the Kawasaki Racing Team mutually agreed to end their sporting relationship.

Return (2023)
After a year of absence, Sykes signed a contract with Puccetti Kawasaki Racing. He will compete at Superbike World Championship in 2023.

Career statistics

All-time statistics

British Supersport Championship

Races by year
(key)

British Superbike Championship

Races by year
(key)

Superbike World Championship

Races by year
(key) (Races in bold indicate pole position, races in italics indicate fastest lap)

References

External links

 
 Profile at Yamaha Racing website
 Profile at Rizla Suziki website

Living people
1985 births
Sportspeople from Huddersfield
British motorcycle racers
English motorcycle racers
British Supersport Championship riders
British Superbike Championship riders
Superbike World Championship riders